Brandywine is a  census-designated place (CDP) located on U.S. Highway 33 in Pendleton County, West Virginia, United States. The town lies along the South Fork South Branch Potomac River at its confluence with Hawes Run. At the 2019 census, its population was 147.

Located nearby within the George Washington National Forest is the Brandywine Recreation Area which includes Brandywine Lake, a reservoir on Hawes Run created by the South Fork Structure Number 13 Dam. 

Located near Brandywine is the Old Probst Church, listed on the National Register of Historic Places in 1986.

References

Census-designated places in Pendleton County, West Virginia
Census-designated places in West Virginia